Clifton may refer to:

People
Clifton (surname)
Clifton (given name)

Places

Australia
Clifton, Queensland, a town
Shire of Clifton
Clifton, New South Wales, a suburb of Wollongong
Clifton, Western Australia

Canada
Clifton, Nova Scotia, a rural community
Clifton, a former name of New London, Prince Edward Island
Clifton, a former name of Niagara Falls

England
Clifton, Bedfordshire
Clifton, Bristol, a suburb
Clifton Suspension Bridge
Clifton, Cheshire, a location
Clifton, Cumbria, village near Penrith
Great Clifton, Cumbria
Little Clifton, Cumbria
Clifton, Derbyshire
Clifton, Devon, a location
Clifton, Doncaster, village in the borough of Doncaster, South Yorkshire
Clifton, Greater Manchester, in the City of Salford
Clifton, Lancashire, village west of Preston
Clifton, Northumberland, a hamlet
Clifton, Nottinghamshire, near Nottingham
North Clifton, Nottinghamshire
South Clifton, Nottinghamshire
 Clifton, Harrogate, North Yorkshire
Clifton, York, a suburb 
Clifton Without
Clifton-on-Yore, a civil parish in North Yorkshire
Clifton, Oxfordshire, a hamlet 
Clifton, Rotherham, a suburb 
Clifton, West Yorkshire
Clifton, Worcestershire

New Zealand
Clifton, Christchurch, a suburb of Christchurch
Clifton, Hawke's Bay, a town 
Clifton, Invercargill, a suburb of Invercargill
Clifton, Tasman, a locality in Golden Bay
Clifton, Auckland, the home of Josiah Firth and a Category 1 Heritage New Zealand listed building

Pakistan
Clifton, Karachi, a neighborhood
Clifton Beach, Karachi
Clifton Cantonment, Karachi

United States
Clifton, Arizona, a town
Clifton, former name of Del Rey, California
Clifton, former name of Last Chance, California
Clifton, Colorado, a census-designated place
Clifton, Idaho, a small city
Clifton, Illinois, a village
Clifton, Indiana, an unincorporated community
Clifton, Kansas, a city
Clifton, Louisiana, an unincorporated community
Clifton, Louisville, Kentucky, a neighborhood east of downtown Louisville
Clifton, Maine, a town
Clifton, Massachusetts
Clifton, Michigan, a ghost town
Clifton, Nevada, a ghost town
Clifton Township, Lyon County, Minnesota
Clifton Township, Traverse County, Minnesota
Clifton, Oregon County, Missouri, an unincorporated community
Clifton, Schuyler County, Missouri, an unincorporated community
Clifton City, Missouri, an unincorporated community
Clifton, New Jersey, a city
Clifton, New York, a town
Clifton, Staten Island, New York
Clifton, North Carolina, an unincorporated community
Clifton, Ohio, a village
Clifton, Cincinnati, Ohio, a neighborhood in Cincinnati
Clifton, Clatsop County, Oregon
Clifton, Hood River County, Oregon
Clifton Township, Lackawanna County, Pennsylvania
Clifton, Tennessee, a city
Clifton, Texas, a city
Clifton, Virginia, a town
Clifton, Grant County, Wisconsin, a town
Clifton, Monroe County, Wisconsin, a town
Clifton, Pierce County, Wisconsin, a town
Clifton (community), Wisconsin, an unincorporated community

Historic sites
Clifton Park, Baltimore, an urban park and the location of the "Clifton Mansion"
Clifton (Davenport, Iowa)
Clifton (Clarksville, Maryland)
Clifton (Ednor, Maryland)
Clifton (Roslyn Harbor, New York)
Clifton (Hamilton, Virginia)
Clifton (Kilmarnock, Virginia)
Clifton (Lexington, Virginia)
Clifton (Rixeyville, Virginia)
Clifton (Shadwell, Virginia)

Other countries
Clifton, County Cavan, Ireland
Clifton, Cape Town, South Africa, a suburb
Clifton, Stirling, a location in Scotland
Clifton, Union Island, Saint Vincent and the Grenadines

Transportation
Clifton (NJT station), a New Jersey Transit train station
Clifton (Staten Island Railway station), a Staten Island Railway station
, a steamship that sank with all hands in 1924
 Clifton, a New Zealand Company chartered sailing ship that bought immigrants to Wellington, New Zealand, in 1842
 , a side-wheel gunboat of the American Civil War
 , a station tanker which served from 1945–1946

Other uses 
Clifton (comics), a Franco-Belgian comics series
, several US Navy ships

See also 
Clifton Hall (disambiguation)
Clifton Heights (disambiguation)
Clifton High School (disambiguation)
Clifton Hotel (disambiguation)
Clifton railway station (disambiguation)
Clifton School (disambiguation)
Clifden (disambiguation)